Fox Creek is a town in northwest Alberta, Canada.

Fox Creek is within the Upper Peace planning region, and is surrounded by the Municipal District of Greenview No. 16.

History 
On June 6, 1952, the townsite for a future community was selected by Ryan Krause and Victor Heath. It was named Fox Creek after the watercourse adjacent to the western edge of the townsite, which drains towards Iosegun Lake to the north. The original survey of the townsite occurred over three days in late October, 1955.

At the same time, a townsite for another future community was surveyed to the north of Fox Creek on Iosegun Lake's eastern shore.  This townsite turned out to be too wet, resulting in no development interest. The provincial government subsequently abandoned plans to develop a community at this location.

Residents began settling in Fox Creek shortly after Highway 43 officially opened in the fall of 1955, attracted by opportunities in the forestry and oil and gas exploration industries. The first two houses were built by Alberta Forest Services in 1956 to support a new ranger station that opened in 1957. Fox Creek's first two roadways, 1 Street West (the initial stage of Kaybob Drive) and Highway Avenue, were also constructed in 1956.

In 1957, the first significant oil field was discovered north of Fox Creek, known as the Kaybob North Field, and the community's first two businesses were established.  Both businesses were services stations – under the British American and Imperial Oil banners – each with associated restaurants.

The community's post office was founded on March 18, 1958. It was named the Iosegun Lake Post Office, which was not officially renamed to the Fox Creek Post Office until 10 years later.

The late 1950s and early 1960s brought much activity to the Hamlet of Fox Creek as numerous sawmills, drilling rigs, and camps supporting drilling and road construction activities had established in the area. A total of 12 oil and gas fields were discovered over a six-year span between 1957 and 1962, of which included the discovery of a significant gas field to the south of Fox Creek in 1961 known as the Kaybob South Field. These discoveries triggered the construction of five gas plants in the Fox Creek area over the eleven years that followed the discovery of the Kaybob South Field.

The 1961 Census of Canada was the first census to record Fox Creek's population, but under the name of Iosegun Lake after the post office in the community. Its population in 1961 was 144. Over the following five years, Fox Creek grew to 187 residents according to the 1966 Census of Canada.

Under the signature of Premier Ernest Manning on July 19, 1967, the Province of Alberta incorporated the community as the New Town of Fox Creek. A three-member Board of Administrators was appointed at the time of incorporation, which included resident and businessman Otto Ritter as chairman and two public administrators from Alberta Municipal Affairs, Earl Briscoe (deputy chairman) and Len Gurel.

Geography 
The town is within  of three lakes – Smoke Lake to the southwest, Iosegun Lake to the north, and Raspberry Lake to the northeast. The Fox Creek flows through the community, which empties into Iosegun Lake.

The Fox Creek area was subject to three earthquakes in 2015. No damages were reported on the former, while the latter was "lightly felt" within Fox Creek and has been reported as potentially being related to hydraulic fracturing within the Duvernay Formation.

Demographics 

In the 2016 Census of Population conducted by Statistics Canada, the Town of Fox Creek recorded a population of 1,971 living in 775 of its 1,054 total private dwellings, a  change from its 2011 population of 1,969.

Government 
Fox Creek Town Council consists of a mayor and six councillors. The mayor and councillors were elected in the 2017 municipal election. The current members of town council are Mayor James Hailes and councillors Diane Ahn, Meesha McMullen Bainton, Brenda Burridge, Sheila Gilmour, and Chris Stadnyk. The town's chief administrative officer is Kristen Milne.

Fox Creek is located within the Central Peace-Notley provincial electoral district, represented by Todd Loewen of the United Conservative Party. At the federal level, Fox Creek is located within the Peace River—Westlock electoral district and is represented by Conservative Arnold Viersen.

Economy 
Fox Creek's economy is driven by the resource industry with oil and gas playing the primary role. The major oil and gas employer in the area, since the first decade of the 21st century, is SemCAMS, which purchased various area facilities previously owned by a mix of Chevron, BP Amoco and Petro-Canada. , the company owns and operates two sour gas processing plants (Kaybob South No. 3 and Kaybob Amalgamated), a sweet gas processing plant (West Fox Creek), and numerous pipelines in the area.  The oilfield service industry supports oil and gas activities in the area, with numerous drilling and well service companies having branch offices in Fox Creek.

Fox Creek's secondary resource-based industry is forestry. Its role in Fox Creek's economy was threatened after a fire destroyed the area's lone sawmill – owned and operated by Millar Western Forest Products Ltd. – on August 29, 2008. After nearly two years of uncertainty about forestry's re-emergence in the local economy, Millar Western announced on June 18, 2010 that it would rebuild the Fox Creek sawmill.  the sawmill, named the Fox Creek Wood Products Division, employs 55 full-time staff producing dimension lumber in the amount of 620,000 board feet per shift or 125 million board feet per year. It has been operating on a single shift since full startup, which occurred in late 2011. The Fox Creek sawmill was acquired by Millar Western from Mostowich Lumber on August 1, 2007.

Other employers in Fox Creek are small in comparison to SemCAMS, Millar Western, and the oilfield service industry. Due to the town's location on Highway 43, the town has numerous service industry businesses that cater to travelers and workers supporting the oil and gas industry, as well as trucking operations.

Education 
Fox Creek School, operated by Northern Gateway Public Schools, is the primary educational institution in Fox Creek, serving students from Kindergarten to Grade 12. The school was attended by 455 students during the 2009/2010 school year, including 14 students in the Fox Creek Talent Developmental Centre program.

See also 
Fox Creek Airport
List of communities in Alberta
List of towns in Alberta

References

External links 

1967 establishments in Alberta
Populated places established in 1955
Towns in Alberta
Former new towns in Alberta